Jovica Rujević (born 1 July 1977) is a Serbian male badminton player, and a former South Africa national badminton team. In 1996, he was the semi finalist at the South Africa International tournament in the men's doubles event with Dave Calvert. In 2013, he reach the final round at the Botswana International tournament in the men's doubles event partnered with Andries Malan. The duo became the runner-up after defeated by the Slovenian pair in the rubber game. At the Balkan Badminton Championships, he won the bronze medal in the mixed team event. He and Malan also the semi finalist at the 2016 South Africa International tournament. He also play for the Novi Sad badminton club, and in 2013 he won the men's and mixed doubles title at the  Vojvodina Championship, and also became the runner-up in the men's singles event.

Achievements

BWF International Challenge/Series
Men's Doubles

 BWF International Challenge tournament
 BWF International Series tournament
 BWF Future Series tournament

References

External links
 

1977 births
Living people
Sportspeople from Welkom
Serbian male badminton players
South African people of Serbian descent
South African male badminton players